The French submarine Ariane was one of eight s built for the French Navy during the 1910s and completed during World War I.

During World War I, Ariane was torpedoed and sunk in the Mediterranean Sea off Cap Bon, French Tunisia, on 19 June 1917 by the Imperial German Navy submarine .

Notes

Bibliography

 

Amphitrite-class submarines
1914 ships
Ships built in France
Maritime incidents in 1917
Ships sunk by German submarines in World War I
World War I shipwrecks in the Mediterranean Sea
Lost submarines of France
Submarines sunk by submarines